Benjamin B. Hodge (born March 20, 1980) is an American former politician who served in the Kansas House of Representatives as a Republican  for slightly less than one term. He was originally elected to the Kansas House in 2006, winning relatively close victories in both the primary (53%, vs. 47% for fellow Republican Bobby Love) and the general election (55%, vs. 45% for Democrat Bond Faulwell). He succeeded Scott Schwab in the state house, who instead ran for election to the U.S. House of Representatives, but was defeated in the primary. Hodge resigned his state house seat in May of 2008, and Schwab successfully ran for his old state house seat in that year's elections.

References

1980 births
Living people
Republican Party members of the Kansas House of Representatives
21st-century American politicians
Politicians from Overland Park, Kansas